For Michaelis–Menten–Monod (MMM) kinetics it is intended the coupling of an enzyme-driven chemical reaction of the Michaelis–Menten type with the Monod growth of an organisms that performs the chemical reaction. The enzyme-driven reaction can be conceptualized as the binding of an enzyme E with the substrate S to form an intermediate complex C, which releases the reaction product P and the unchanged enzyme E. During the metabolic consumption of S, biomass B is produced, which synthesizes the enzyme, thus feeding back to the chemical reaction. The two processes can be expressed as

Transient kinetics

The kinetic equations describing the reactions above can be derived from the GEBIK equations and are written as

These equations describe the full transient kinetics, but cannot be normally constrained to experiments because the complex C is difficult to measure and there is no clear consensus on whether it actually exists.

Quasi-steady-state kinetics

where  is the Michaelis–Menten constant (also known as the half-saturation concentration and affinity).

Implicit analytic solution 

If one hypothesizes that the enzyme is produced at a rate proportional to the biomass production and degrades at a rate proportional to the biomass mortality, then Eqs. 4 can be rewritten as

Note that Eq. (4b) and (4d) are linearly dependent on Eqs. (4a) and (4c), which are the two differential equations that can be used to solve the MMM problem.

(4d). The analytic solution to Eq. (5b) is

with the initial biomass concentration  when . (6) as

Substituting Eq. (7) into Eq.

with the constants
  
 

 
  

  
 

 

(7) at a time  given by Eq. (8).

See also
 Enzyme kinetics
 Michaelis–Menten kinetics
 Monod 
 GEBIK equations

References

Enzyme kinetics